The Hoff Open is a tennis tournament held in Moscow, Russia since 2015. The event is part of the ATP Challenger Tour and is played on outdoor clay courts.

Past finals

Singles

Doubles

References

External links 
 Official website